Troy Gregory (born November 13, 1966) is a singer, songwriter, multi-instrumentalist, filmmaker, film composer, solo artist, and member of The Dirtbombs. Since 2018 for his solo Albums he has composed, produced, and performed all instruments by himself. Additionally he creates his own album art and music videos. In 2010 he wrote, directed, edited, scored and acted in the film World War Love. Former acts he has worked with include Crime & the City Solution, Flotsam and Jetsam, Prong, Sixto Diaz Rodriguez, Kim Fowley, Andre Williams, Killing Joke, Electric Six, Nathaniel Mayer, The Volebeats, Spiritualized, Swans and Damo Suzuki.

Discography

As Troy Gregory
 Sybil (2002, Fall of Rome Records)
 Laura (2004, Fall of Rome Records)
 "Xaviera" (2018, Jett Plastic Recordings)
 "Sand Dollar Castle" (2022, Popsicle Patch)
 "Heroically Versed In Complex Ecosystems" (2022, Popsicle Patch)
 "The Carnival Crowd" (2022, Popsicle Patch)
 “Willow Ash Oak Juniper” (2022, Popsicle Patch)
 “Magic Lantern Frosted Lashes” (2022, Popsicle Patch)
 “The Anthropocene Scene” (2022, Popsicle Patch)

With Super Birthday
 Abracapocus (2019, Popsicle Patch)

With The Witches
 Let's Go to the No Go Zone (1998, Pushover Records)
 Universal Mall (2000, Fall of Rome Records)
 On Parade (2002, Fall of Rome Records)
 Thriller (2006, Music for Cats)
 "A Haunted Persons Guide to the Witches" (2011, Alive Natural Sound Records)

With The Dirtbombs
 Dangerous Magical Noise (2003, In The Red Records)
 Billiards at Nine Thirty (2005, Sounds Subterrania)
 If You Don't Already Have a Look (2005, In the Red Records)
 We Have You Surrounded (2008, In the Red Records)

With Simon Bonney
 Past,Present,Future (2019, Mute Records)

With Crime and the City Solution
"American Twilight" (2013, Mute Records)

With Nathaniel Mayer
Why Don't You Give It to Me (2007, Alive Natural Sound Records)
Why Won't You Let Me Be Black (2009, Alive Natural Sound Records)

With Denise James
 It's Not Enough to Love, (2004, Rainbow Quartz)

With Monster Island
 Dream Tiger, (2001, End Is Here)

With Larval
 Larval 2, (1998, Knitting Factory)

With Medusa Cyclone
 Medusa Cyclone, (1995, Third Gear)

With Flotsam and Jetsam
 No Place for Disgrace (1988, Roadrunner Records/ Elektra Records)
 When the Storm Comes Down (1990, MCA Records)

With Prong
 Prove You Wrong (1991, Epic Records)

With Swans
 Love of Life (1992, Young God Records)

With Spiritualized
"A & E" (2008, Fontana Records)

With Andre Williams
"That's All I Need" (2010, Bloodshot Records)
"Hoods And Shades" (2012, Bloodshot Records)
"I Wanna Go Back To Detroit City" (2016, Bloodshot Records)

References

Further reading

External links
 

1966 births
Musicians from Detroit
American rock musicians
American male singer-songwriters
American rock songwriters
American rock singers
Killing Joke members
Living people
Crime & the City Solution members
Prong (band) members
Singer-songwriters from Michigan